Greater Stavanger Region is a statistical metropolitan region in the county of Rogaland in southwestern Norway. It is centered on the metro's economical and cultural centre Stavanger. The metropolitan area is the third most populous in Norway as of July 2015.

1/ km22/ Population per km2

See also
Metropolitan Regions of Norway

External links
Region Stavanger Official tourism site of the Stavanger region
 Statistics Norway Q2 2014

Stavanger
Metropolitan regions of Norway
Jæren